The Belarusian Figure Skating Championships are the annual figure skating national championships of Belarus. Medals may be awarded in the disciplines of men's singles, ladies' singles, pair skating, and ice dancing, across different levels. Not every event has been held in every year due to a lack of entries. Orthography of competitors' names may vary in different sources. This article uses ISU spelling.

Senior medalists

Men

Ladies

Pairs

Ice dancing

Junior medalists

Men

Ladies

Pairs

Ice dancing

References

 interwiki Russian

External links
 Skating Union of Belarus at the International Skating Union

Figure skating in Belarus
Figure skating national championships
Figure Skating